The House of Stuart is a noble family of Scottish origin that eventually became monarchs of Scotland, England, Ireland, and Great Britain.

Clan Stewart

House of Stuart

Senior branch

Royal House of Stuart (Stuart-Lennox) 

Branch issued from the marriage of Marie Stuart and Henry Stuart, Lord Darnley, (7 December 1545 – 9 or 10 February 1567), Baron Darnley, Duke of Albany and King consort of Scotland,

Branches descended from Charles II of England

House Scott of Buccleuch 

Branch descended from James Crofts, illegitimate son of Lucy Walter and of Charles II of England,

House FitzCharles of Plymouth

House FitzRoy of Grafton 

Branch descended Charles II of England and his mistress Barbara Palmer

House Beauclerk of St Albans 

Branch descended from Charles Beauclerk, illegitimate son of Nell Gwynne, mistress of Charles II of England,

House Lennox of Richmond

Branch descended from Charles Lennox, natural son of Charles II of England,

Branch descended from James II of England

House of FitzJames 

Branch descended from James FitzJames, 1st Duke of Berwick, natural son of James II of England,

Stuart of Albany 

Branch descended from Robert Stuart, Duke of Albany, son of Robert II of Scotland.

Stuart of Darnley

Earls, then Dukes of Lennox

Stuart of Bute

Other branches

See also 
 House of Stuart

Notes

References

Further reading 
 Dynastie Stuart
 Rietstap-Armorial

House of Stuart
Stuart